The Swedish National Road and Transport Research Institute (VTI) is a public research institution with focus on transportation in Sweden. The head office is located in Linköping, where most of the operations are located.

History 
The Swedish National Road and Transport Research Institute was founded between 1923 and 1925.  Since then it has changed names from the National Road Institute in 1934 and then the Swedish National Road and Traffic Research Institute in 1971. It was renamed to the National Road and Transport Research Institute in 1993.

Sites 
VTI has also offices in several sites all over Sweden. It has offices in Borlänge and Stockholm where the research is in transport economics and transport policy. Another office is located in Gothenburg with research focusing on vehicle technology and vehicle safety and in Lund with a focus on public transport.

Transport Forum 
VTI is the main organizer of Transport Forum, a large Swedish conference gathering important national and international actors in the field of transportation.

Gallery

Notes and references

External links
Official website (english)

Research institutes in Sweden
1920s establishments in Sweden